The Etihad Museum, historically called the Union House and formerly as the al-Diyafah Palace and the Jumeirah Guesthouse, is a museum in Dubai, United Arab Emirates that collects, preserves, and displays the heritage of the United Arab Emirates in the areas of social, political, cultural, scientific, and military history. It holds everything from old passports to personal artifacts of the rulers of United Arab Emirates. The historic signing of the Constitution of the United Arab Emirates, the raising of the first UAE flag, and the formation of the United Arab Emirates as a country on 2 December 1971 took place within the area that forms the museum today. The museum is designed as a document to signify the signing of the UAE constitution. It costs 25 AED (6.81 USD) for an adult to visit it.

History

The museum encompasses the Union house, the location where the emirate's founding fathers signed a declaration that marked the formation of the UAE in 1971 – it is now part of the museum complex.

Building
The museum was designed by Moriyama & Teshima Architects in the shape of a manuscript, with seven columns built into the museum to resemble the pens used to sign the original declaration. The building has eight permanent pavilions:

Pavilion One: Shows a documentary film about the history of the UAE.

Pavilion Two: Houses a panoramic interactive map highlighting the era before the formation of the federation.

Pavilion Three: An interactive timeline that demonstrates key historical events before the union.

Al Maktoum|Sheikh Rashid bin Saeed Al Maktoum]].

Pavilion four: An interactive guide to the formation of the union.

Pavilion Six: A homage to the important moments and challenges confronted the founding fathers before 1971.

Pavilion Seven: This is dedicated to the UAE Constitution and includes the actual declaration itself.

Pavilion Eight: The final pavilion is an open gallery celebrating the newborn nation.

See also
 List of museums in the United Arab Emirates
 Culture of the United Arab Emirates

References

2017 establishments in the United Arab Emirates
Museums established in 2017
History museums in the United Arab Emirates
National museums of the United Arab Emirates
Museums in Dubai